is a Japanese voice actress from Sumida, Tokyo, Japan. She currently works for Aoni Production. She also starred in the live-action film Cat Girl Kiki.

Anime cast in
Ayakashi ~ Japanese Classic Horror as Wominaheshi (Tenshu Monogatari)
Chrome Shelled Regios as Dalshena Che MatelnaClaymore as Carla
D.C.S.S. ~Da Capo Second Season~ as Female Student
Gintama as Eromes
Glass Mask as Official (ep 23)
Gosick as Cecile Lafitte
Himawari! as Momota
Kamisama Kazoku as Female student (ep 1); Nurse (ep 6)
Lucky Star as Hikage Miyakawa
Nabari no Ou as Kazuho Amatatsu 
One Piece as Ban Dedessinée, Ishilly, Chao, Lady Tree, Charlotte Marnier, Charlotte Custard and Charlotte Fuyumeg
Peach Girl as female student A (ep 21)
Queen's Blade as Irma
Rune Factory Frontier as Rosetta
Sumomomo Momomo as Momoko Kuzuryu
Transformers: Kiss Players as Shāoshāo Lǐ
Valkyria Chronicles as Edy Nelson; Anisette Nelson; Ramsey Clement
Wagaya no Oinari-sama as Sakura Misaki
Yume Tsukai as Megumi Hamachi (ep 4)

Video Games cast in
Deardrops as Kaguya Riho

References

External links
  Yui Kano at Aoni Production
  Yui Kano's Roman Nikki Blog
  Yui Kano Seichōjū - Mahō no iLand
  - Anitama.com - Atsumare Masa-Kano Henshūbu

Japanese voice actresses
Japanese film actresses
Aoni Production voice actors
1983 births
People from Sumida
Voice actresses from Tokyo
Living people
21st-century Japanese actresses